Lakhera,  Lakhara, Lakshakar, Laxkar, Lakhpati, Lakshkar, Lakhera, Lakeri and Lakheri etc...  

Lakhera caste comes under the Hindu rajputs who are Kshatriyas of the Hindu caste system  . Lakhera is an occupational based caste living in Uttarakhand, Rajasthan, Haryana, Madhya Pradesh, Uttar Pradesh, Punjab, Bihar and Maharashtra.

Origin

The Lakhera' get their name from the Sanskrit laksha kuru'' meaning a worker in lac. According to their mythologies, this caste created by the goddess Parvati. They are said to have originated in Rajasthan, and then spread to Uttarakhand, Delhi, Haryana, Rajasthan, Gujarat, Madhya Pradesh, Punjab and Maharashtra. The community in Delhi speaks Hindi,Uttrakhand Garhwali, Haryana Haryanvi, Rajasthan and Madhya Pradesh Mewari,Bundeli, Bagheli, Marwari, Hadoti and Hindi, In Maharshtra can speak Marathi, Marwadi. They are known as Lakheri, Lakeri in Maharashtra. In Pandharpur (Dist-Solapur, Maharshtra)

The main goddess of this caste is Sati Mata (that is, Shree Chena Mata and Kushla Mata), Rupji Maharaj, and Tadkeshwar Mahadev. There are many gotra and sub gotra in lakhera caste

Present circumstances

The Lakhera community consists of a number of clans, the main ones being the Hatria (gahlot), Garhwali(Bhardwaj), Bagri(Rathore), Nagoriya, Parihar, Bhati, Nainvaya, Solanki,Tanwar, Panwar, Kathuniya, Chauhan and Atariya. They are an endogamous community, and each clan is exogamous. The majority of the Lakhera are still involved in the manufacture and selling of bangles. Some members of the community are now shopkeepers. The Lakhera are Hindu, and have customs similar to other North Indian Hindus. They live in multi-caste villages, occupying their own distinct quarters.

In Uttar Pradesh, the community is found mainly in the south and east of the state. They are found mainly in Jalaun, Hamirpur, Lalitpur and Jhansi.

Lakhera is an occupational based caste residing in Rajasthan, Haryana, Madhya Pradesh, Uttar Pradesh, Punjab, and Bihar, Maharashtra. barhi and jabalpur People of Lakhera community are professional artist of Lakh (substance used to make bangles) which is an inherent heritage of Lakhera community. Prime objective of Lakhera group is to enhance the knowledge about Lakhera community through the process of sharing, getting together and then working to achieve the objectives. To makes efforts, to integrate Lakhera community, achieve maximum cooperation and mutual understanding by all the ways of formal and informal discussions, academic relations and personal interactions.
Caste's National youth Organization is Akhil Bhartiya Lakhara Yuva Sanghatan (ABLYS).

Their surnames in Maharashtra are Bagade, Bhate, Chavan, Hatade, Nagare, Padiyar, Ratvad and Salunke. Men add ji or sir to their names. Lakheras with the same surname did not inter-marry in the nineteenth and twentieth century. Their family-god is Balaji, also known as Vyankoba of Tirupati, whose image they keep in their houses and worship with flowers, sandal paste and food. Their home-tongue is Marwari and out-of-doors they speak Marathi. They have no priest of their own but ask local Brahmins to conduct their ceremonies. They also worship Bhavani Devi of Tuljapur.

References

Social groups of Haryana
Social groups of Uttar Pradesh
Indian castes
Punjabi tribes